In optics, the Airy disk (or Airy disc) and Airy pattern are descriptions of the best-focused spot of light that a perfect lens with a circular aperture can make, limited by the diffraction of light. The Airy disk is of importance in physics, optics, and astronomy.

The diffraction pattern resulting from a uniformly illuminated, circular aperture has a bright central region, known as the Airy disk, which together with the series of concentric rings around is called the Airy pattern. Both are named after George Biddell Airy. The disk and rings phenomenon had been known prior to Airy; John Herschel described the appearance of a bright star seen through a telescope under high magnification for an 1828 article on light for the Encyclopedia Metropolitana:

Airy wrote the first full theoretical treatment explaining the phenomenon (his 1835 "On the Diffraction of an Object-glass with Circular Aperture").

Mathematically, the diffraction pattern is characterized by the wavelength of light illuminating the circular aperture, and the aperture's size. The appearance of the diffraction pattern is additionally characterized by the sensitivity of the eye or other detector used to observe the pattern.

The most important application of this concept is in cameras, microscopes and telescopes. Due to diffraction, the smallest point to which a lens or mirror can focus a beam of light is the size of the Airy disk. Even if one were able to make a perfect lens, there is still a limit to the resolution of an image created by such a lens. An optical system in which the resolution is no longer limited by imperfections in the lenses but only by diffraction is said to be diffraction limited.

Size
Far from the aperture, the angle at which the first minimum occurs, measured from the direction of incoming light, is given by the approximate formula:

or, for small angles, simply

where θ is in radians, λ is the wavelength of the light in meters, and d is the diameter of the aperture in meters.

Airy wrote this relation as

where s was the angle of first minimum in seconds of arc, a was the radius of the aperture in inches, and the wavelength of light was assumed to be 0.000022 inches (560 nm; the mean of visible wavelengths).  This is equal to the angular resolution of a circular aperture.  The Rayleigh criterion for barely resolving two objects that are point sources of light, such as stars seen through a telescope, is that the center of the Airy disk for the first object occurs at the first minimum of the Airy disk of the second.  This means that the angular resolution of a diffraction-limited system is given by the same formulae.

However, while the angle at which the first minimum occurs (which is sometimes described as the radius of the Airy disk) depends only on wavelength and aperture size, the appearance of the diffraction pattern will vary with the intensity (brightness) of the light source.  Because any detector (eye, film, digital) used to observe the diffraction pattern can have an intensity threshold for detection, the full diffraction pattern may not be apparent.  In astronomy, the outer rings are frequently not apparent even in a highly magnified image of a star.  It may be that none of the rings are apparent, in which case the star image appears as a disk (central maximum only) rather than as a full diffraction pattern.  Furthermore, fainter stars will appear as smaller disks than brighter stars, because less of their central maximum reaches the threshold of detection.  While in theory all stars or other "point sources" of a given wavelength and seen through a given aperture have the same Airy disk radius characterized by the above equation (and the same diffraction pattern size), differing only in intensity, the appearance is that fainter sources appear as smaller disks, and brighter sources appear as larger disks.  This was described by Airy in his original work:
The rapid decrease of light in the successive rings will sufficiently explain the visibility of two or three rings with a very bright star and the non-visibility of rings with a faint star. The difference of the diameters of the central spots (or spurious disks) of different stars ... is also fully explained. Thus the radius of the spurious disk of a faint star, where light of less than half the intensity of the central light makes no impression on the eye, is determined by [s = 1.17/a], whereas the radius of the spurious disk of a bright star, where light of 1/10 the intensity of the central light is sensible, is determined by [s = 1.97/a].
Despite this feature of Airy's work, the radius of the Airy disk is often given as being simply the angle of first minimum, even in standard textbooks.  In reality, the angle of first minimum is a limiting value for the size of the Airy disk, and not a definite radius.

Examples

Cameras
If two objects imaged by a camera are separated by an angle small enough that their Airy disks on the camera detector start overlapping, the objects cannot be clearly separated any more in the image, and they start blurring together. Two objects are said to be just resolved when the maximum of the first Airy pattern falls on top of the first minimum of the second Airy pattern (the Rayleigh criterion).

Therefore, the smallest angular separation two objects can have before they significantly blur together is given as stated above by

Thus, the ability of the system to resolve detail is limited by the ratio of λ/d. The larger the aperture for a given wavelength, the finer the detail that can be distinguished in the image.

This can also be expressed as

If we take the distance from the lens to the film to be approximately equal to the focal length of the lens, we find

but  is the f-number of a lens. A typical setting for use on an overcast day would be  (see Sunny 16 rule). For violet, the shortest wavelength visible light, the wavelength λ is about 420 nanometers (see cone cells for sensitivity of S cone cells). In a digital camera, making the pixels of the image sensor smaller than half this value (one pixel for each object, one for each space between) would not significantly increase the captured image resolution. However, it may improve the final image by over-sampling, allowing noise reduction.

The human eye

The fastest f-number for the human eye is about 2.1, corresponding to a diffraction-limited point spread function with approximately 1 μm diameter. However, at this f-number, spherical aberration limits visual acuity, while a 3 mm pupil diameter (f/5.7) approximates the resolution achieved by the human eye. The maximum density of cones in the human fovea is approximately 170,000 per square millimeter, which implies that the cone spacing in the human eye is about 2.5 μm, approximately the diameter of the point spread function at f/5.

Focused laser beam
A circular laser beam with uniform intensity across the circle (a flat-top beam) focused by a lens will form an Airy disk pattern at the focus. The size of the Airy disk determines the laser intensity at the focus.

Aiming sight
Some weapon aiming sights (e.g. FN FNC) require the user to align a peep sight (rear, nearby sight, i.e. which will be out of focus) with a tip (which should be focused and overlaid on the target) at the end of the barrel. When looking through the peep sight, the user will notice an Airy disk that will help center the sight over the pin.

Conditions for observation

Light from a uniformly illuminated circular aperture (or from a uniform, flattop beam) will exhibit an Airy diffraction pattern far away from the aperture due to Fraunhofer diffraction (far-field diffraction).

The conditions for being in the far field and exhibiting an Airy pattern are: the incoming light illuminating the aperture is a plane wave (no phase variation across the aperture), the intensity is constant over the area of the aperture, and the distance  from the aperture where the diffracted light is observed (the screen distance) is large compared to the aperture size, and the radius  of the aperture is not too much larger than the wavelength  of the light.

In practice, the conditions for uniform illumination can be met by placing the source of the illumination far from the aperture. If the conditions for far field are not met (for example if the aperture is large), the far-field Airy diffraction pattern can also be obtained on a screen much closer to the aperture by using a lens right after the aperture (or the lens itself can form the aperture). The Airy pattern will then be formed at the focus of the lens rather than at infinity.

Hence, the focal spot of a uniform circular laser beam (a flattop beam) focused by a lens will also be an Airy pattern.

In a camera or imaging system an object far away gets imaged onto the film or detector plane by the objective lens, and the far field diffraction pattern is observed at the detector. The resulting image is a convolution of the ideal image with the Airy diffraction pattern due to diffraction from the iris aperture or due to the finite size of the lens. This leads to the finite resolution of a lens system described above.

Mathematical formulation

The intensity of the Airy pattern follows the Fraunhofer diffraction pattern of a circular aperture, given by the squared modulus of the Fourier transform of the circular aperture:

, where q is the radial distance from the observation point to the optical axis and R is its distance to the aperture. Note that the Airy disk as given by the above expression is only valid for large R, where Fraunhofer diffraction applies; calculation of the shadow in the near-field must rather be handled using Fresnel diffraction.

However the exact Airy pattern does appear at a finite distance if a lens is placed at the aperture. Then the Airy pattern will be perfectly focussed at the distance given by the lens's focal length (assuming collimated light incident on the aperture) given by the above equations.

From this, it follows that the first dark ring in the diffraction pattern occurs where , or

.

If a lens is used to focus the Airy pattern at a finite distance, then the radius  of the first dark ring on the focal plane is solely given by the numerical aperture A (closely related to the  f-number) by

where the numerical aperture A is equal to the aperture's radius d/2 divided by R', the distance from the center of the Airy pattern to the edge of the aperture. This shows that the best possible image resolution of a camera is limited by the numerical aperture (and thus f-number) of its lens due to diffraction.

The intensity  at the center of the diffraction pattern is related to the total power  incident on the aperture by

where  is the source strength per unit area at the aperture, A is the area of the aperture and R is the distance from the aperture. At the focal plane of a lens, . The intensity at the maximum of the first ring is about 1.75% of the intensity at the center of the Airy disk.

Hence the fractions of the total power contained within the first, second, and third dark rings (where ) are 83.8%, 91.0%, and 93.8% respectively.

Approximation using a Gaussian profile

The Airy pattern falls rather slowly to zero with increasing distance from the center, with the outer rings containing a significant portion of the integrated intensity of the pattern. As a result, the  root mean square (RMS) spotsize is undefined (i.e. infinite).  An alternative measure of the spot size is to ignore the relatively small outer rings of the Airy pattern and to approximate the central lobe with a Gaussian profile, such that

If we equate the peak amplitude of the Airy pattern and Gaussian profile, that is, and find the value of  giving the optimal approximation to the pattern, we obtain

where N is the f-number. If, on the other hand, we wish to enforce that the Gaussian profile has the same volume as does the Airy pattern, then this becomes

In optical aberration theory, it is common to describe an imaging system as diffraction-limited if the Airy disk radius is larger than the RMS spotsize determined from geometric ray tracing (see Optical lens design).

Obscured Airy pattern
Similar equations can also be derived for the obscured Airy diffraction pattern which is the diffraction pattern from an annular aperture or beam, i.e. a uniform circular aperture (beam) obscured by a circular block at the center.  This situation is relevant to many common reflector telescope designs that incorporate a secondary mirror, including Newtonian telescopes and Schmidt–Cassegrain telescopes.

where  is the annular aperture obscuration ratio, or the ratio of the diameter of the obscuring disk and the diameter of the aperture (beam). The fractional encircled energy (the fraction of the total energy contained within a circle of radius  centered at the optical axis in the focal plane) is then given by:

For  the formulas reduce to the unobscured versions above.

The practical effect of having a central obstruction in a telescope is that the central disc becomes slightly smaller, and the first bright ring becomes brighter at the expense of the central disc. This becomes more problematic with short focal length telescopes which require larger secondary mirrors.

Comparison to Gaussian beam focus
A circular laser beam with uniform intensity profile, focused by a lens, will form an Airy pattern at the focal plane of the lens.

A Gaussian beam transmitted through a hard aperture will be clipped.  Energy is lost and edge diffraction occurs effectively increasing the divergence.  Because of these effects there is a Gaussian beam diameter which maximizes the intensity in the far field.  This occurs when the  diameter of the Gaussian is 89% of the aperture diameter, and the on axis intensity in the far field will be 81% of that produced by a uniform intensity profile.

See also

 Amateur astronomy
 Apodization
 Fraunhofer diffraction
 Bloom (shader effect)
 Newton's rings
 Optical unit
 Point spread function
 Debye-Scherrer ring
 Strehl ratio
 Speckle pattern

Notes and references

External links
  Nikon MicroscopyU (website).
 (Interactive Java Tutorial) Molecular Expressions (website).
 (Interactive Java Tutorial) Molecular Expressions.
 , Connexions (website), November 8, 2005. – Mathematical details to derive the above formula.
 "The Airy Disk: An Explanation Of What It Is, And Why You Can’t Avoid It", Oldham Optical UK.
 
 

Physical optics
Diffraction